Thomas Boner (died 1422) was the member of the Parliament of England for Salisbury for the parliament of December 1421. He was also reeve and constable of Salisbury.

References 

Members of Parliament for Salisbury
Year of birth unknown
Reeves (England)
1422 deaths
English MPs December 1421